Charles d'Amboise, Seigneur de Chaumont (1473 – 11 February 1511) was a French nobleman, who acted as French governor of Milan (1503–1511) during the reign of Louis XII and as a French commander during the War of the League of Cambrai.

Biography 
Born at Chaumont-sur-Loire into the House of Amboise, Charles was the nephew of Cardinal Georges d'Amboise, prime minister of King Louis XII of France, and the son of Charles I d'Amboise, governor of Champagne and Bourgogne. Charles d'Amboise acted as governor of Paris, of the Duchy of Milan, of the seignory of Genoa, and of the province of Normandie. In 1501 he was made French lieutenant general and then vice-roy for Lombardy, becoming a friend of Leonardo da Vinci during his stay in Milan. He was Grand Master of France from 1502 to 1504, when he became Marshal of France. From 1508 to 1510 he was also admiral of France and in 1507 suppressed a revolt in Genoa.

At the battle of Agnadello, 1509, he commanded the French vanguard. In 1510, he took command of the French forces fighting against Pope Julius II in the Romagna, for which he was excommunicated; he failed to prevent Julius from capturing Bologna and Mirandola, and died of an illness at Correggio, during the 1511 campaign.

His son George died in the Battle of Pavia, 1525.

See also 
 Italian Wars

References 

Amboise, Charles d'
Amboise, Charles d'
Amboise, Charles d'
Amboise, Charles d'
Military governors of Paris
Amboise, Charles d'
Amboise, Charles d'
Amboise, Charles
Amboise, Charles
Charles